The following is a list of films where at least one ninja character appears as a significant plot element.

Japanese cinema

Jidai-geki films

Ninpo-cho films

Silent films

Gendai-geki films

Tokusatsu films

Anime films

Erotic films

American cinema

Action films

Speculative fiction films

Parody films

Asian cinema

Chinese films

Wuxia films

Wushu films

Korean films

Filipino films

International cinema

Other films

Independent and short films

Cut-and-paste films

Minor roles

Miscellaneous

See also
List of ninja television programs
List of ninja video games
List of Japanese films
Ninja in popular culture
Samurai cinema

References

External links
 Iga Ninja Film Festival 
 Vintage Ninja: Film and TV

Ninja